Koopmeiners is a Dutch surname. Notable people with the surname include:

 Peer Koopmeiners (born 2000), Dutch footballer
 Teun Koopmeiners (born 1998), Dutch footballer, brother of Peer

Dutch-language surnames